Runu Guha Thakurta was a former Indian association football player. He was part of the squad that played at the 1952 Summer Olympics against Yugoslavia, but he did not play in the match. He played for both the Calcutta Football League side George Telegraph SC, and Mohun Bagan AC.

Honours

India
Asian Games Gold medal: 1951
 Colombo Cup: 1952
Bengal
Santosh Trophy: 1950-51
Mohun Bagan
Durand Cup: 1953

References

External links
 

Indian footballers
People from Jalpaiguri
Footballers from West Bengal
Mohun Bagan AC players
India international footballers
Olympic footballers of India
Footballers at the 1952 Summer Olympics
Footballers at the 1951 Asian Games
Medalists at the 1951 Asian Games
Asian Games medalists in football
Asian Games gold medalists for India
Association football forwards
Calcutta Football League players